Association Sportive Illzach Modenheim Foot, commonly known as ASIM or just Illzach, is a French association football team founded in 1932. They are based in Illzach, Alsace, France and are currently playing in the Regional 1 Alsace, effectively the sixth tier in the French football league system. They play at the Stade Joseph Biechlin in Illzach.

ASIM reached the 7th round of the 2010–11 and 2012–13 Coupe de France, losing on penalties to US Forbach and 3–2 to SAS Épinal.

References

 coll., 100 ans de football en Alsace (tome 3 : 1921-1932), Strasbourg, Ligue d'Alsace et Edito, 2002, p. 340-341

External links
AS Illzach-Modenheim official website 

Association football clubs established in 1932
1932 establishments in France
Sport in Haut-Rhin
Football clubs in Grand Est